Arlene de Queiroz Xavier (born December 20, 1969) is a volleyball player from Brazil. She represented her native country at the 2004 Summer Olympics in Athens, Greece.

Xavier was named "Best Libero" at the FIVB World Grand Prix 2006 in Reggio Calabria, Italy, where the Brazilian National Team claimed the gold medal for the sixth time at the annual competition.

Clubs
  Minas Tênis Clube (1990–1994)
  BCN Guarujá (1994–1996)
  Pinheiros (1996–1999)
  BCN Osasco (1999–2000)
  Flamengo (2000–2001)
  BCN Osasco (2001–2003)
  Minas Tênis Clube (2003–2004)
  Finasa Osasco (2004–2006)
  Pinheiros (2007–2009)
  Praia Clube (2009–2010)
  Mackenzie (2010–2011)
  Praia Clube (2011–2013)
  Minas Tênis Clube (2013–2014)
  Vôlei São José (2014–2015)
  Vôlei Cascavel (2015–2016)
  Vôlei Bauru (2016–2019)

Awards

Individuals
 2003 FIVB World Cup – "Best Libero"
 2006 FIVB World Grand Prix – "Best Libero"
 2006 Pan-American Cup – "Best Libero"

References
 FIVB profile
 UOL profile

1969 births
Living people
Brazilian women's volleyball players
Volleyball players at the 2004 Summer Olympics
Olympic volleyball players of Brazil
People from Contagem
Liberos
Sportspeople from Minas Gerais